Jim Rodgers OBE is a politician from Northern Ireland who was previously the High Sheriff of Belfast, (succeeded by Incumbent Alderman Thomas Haire 16 January 2017) the judicial representative of the sovereign in Belfast. He is an elected Ulster Unionist Party Councillor and appointed Alderman at Belfast City Council.

Work
In 1973, he stood unsuccessfully as a candidate for the Vanguard Unionist Progressive Party in the election to the Northern Ireland Assembly.

In 1996, he was elected to the Northern Ireland Peace Forum for East Belfast. Rodgers stood in the 1998, 2003 and 2007 Northern Ireland Assembly elections for East Belfast but was unsuccessful on each occasion. He is a councillor for Ormiston DEA on Belfast City Council and was elected as Lord Mayor of Belfast in 2001. Rodgers was again elected Lord Mayor in 2007, he had the backing of the Ulster Unionist Party (UUP) group on the council and the Social Democratic and Labour Party (SDLP).

Currently Rodgers is Chairman of Belfast Education and Library Board, Ex-Chairman of Belfast District Policing Partnership. He is also a member of the Sports Council and Northern Ireland Events Company. He is also a former director of Glentoran FC but resigned from his position a few days before a winding up order from HMRC was due to be heard by the High Court in January 2011.  

At a DPP meeting in Short Strand Community centre on 15 June 2009, he claimed he had been attacked with eggs and stones by members of the IRSP.

In 2010, dressed as a tomato, Ms Mallon who was taking part in the launch of a gourmet garden event in Botanic Gardens, when Mr Rodgers tried to leapfrog over her, causing back injury that resulted in a £24,000 payment.

References

Members of Belfast City Council
Living people
Lord Mayors of Belfast
High Sheriffs of Belfast
Members of the Northern Ireland Forum
Officers of the Order of the British Empire
Ulster Unionist Party councillors
Year of birth missing (living people)